The Hijri calendar, also known  in English as the Muslim calendar and Islamic calendar, is a lunar calendar consisting of 12 lunar months in a year of 354 or 355 days. It is used to determine the proper days of Islamic holidays and rituals, such as the annual fasting and the annual season for the great pilgrimage. In almost all countries where the predominant religion is Islam, the civil calendar is the Gregorian calendar, with Syriac month-names used in the Levant and Mesopotamia (Iraq, Syria, Jordan, Lebanon and Palestine) but the religious calendar is the Hijri one.

This calendar enumerates the Hijri era, whose epoch was established as the Islamic New Year in 622 CE. During that year, Muhammad and his followers migrated from Mecca to Medina and established the first Muslim community (ummah), an event commemorated as the Hijrah. In the West, dates in this era are usually denoted AH ("in the year of the Hijrah"). In Muslim countries, it is also sometimes denoted as H from its Arabic form (abbreviated ). In English, years prior to the Hijra are denoted as BH ("Before the Hijra").

 CE, . In the Gregorian calendar reckoning, 1444 AH runs from approximately 30 July 2022 to 18 July 2023.

History

Pre-Islamic calendar

For central Arabia, especially Mecca, there is a lack of epigraphical evidence but details are found in the writings of Muslim authors of the Abbasid era. Inscriptions of the ancient South Arabian calendars reveal the use of a number of local calendars. At least some of these South Arabian calendars followed the lunisolar system. Both al-Biruni and al-Mas'udi suggest that the ancient Arabs used the same month names as the Muslims, though they also record other month names used by the pre-Islamic Arabs.

The Islamic tradition is unanimous in stating that Arabs of Tihamah, Hejaz, and Najd distinguished between two types of months, permitted (ḥalāl) and forbidden (ḥarām) months. The forbidden months were four months during which fighting is forbidden, listed as Rajab and the three months around the pilgrimage season, Dhu al-Qa‘dah, Dhu al-Hijjah, and Muharram. A similar if not identical concept to the forbidden months is also attested by Procopius, where he describes an armistice that the Eastern Arabs of the Lakhmid al-Mundhir respected for two months in the summer solstice of 541 CE. However, Muslim historians do not link these months to a particular season. The Qur'an links the four forbidden months with Nasī, a word that literally means "postponement". According to Muslim tradition, the decision of postponement was administered by the tribe of Kinanah, by a man known as the al-Qalammas of Kinanah and his descendants (pl. qalāmisa).

Different interpretations of the concept of Nasī have been proposed. Some scholars, both Muslim and Western, maintain that the pre-Islamic calendar used in central Arabia was a purely lunar calendar similar to the modern Islamic calendar. According to this view, Nasī is related to the pre-Islamic practices of the Meccan Arabs, where they would alter the distribution of the forbidden months within a given year without implying a calendar manipulation. This interpretation is supported by Arab historians and lexicographers, like Ibn Hisham, Ibn Manzur, and the corpus of Qur'anic exegesis.

This is corroborated by an early Sabaic inscription, where a religious ritual was "postponed" (ns'w) due to war. According to the context of this inscription, the verb ns'’ has nothing to do with intercalation, but only with moving religious events within the calendar itself. The similarity between the religious concept of this ancient inscription and the Qur'an suggests that non-calendaring postponement is also the Qur'anic meaning of Nasī. The Encyclopaedia of Islam concludes "The Arabic system of [Nasī'] can only have been intended to move the Hajj and the fairs associated with it in the vicinity of Mecca to a suitable season of the year. It was not intended to establish a fixed calendar to be generally observed." The term "fixed calendar" is generally understood to refer to the non-intercalated calendar.

Others concur that it was originally a lunar calendar, but suggest that about 200 years before the Hijra it was transformed into a lunisolar calendar containing an intercalary month added from time to time to keep the pilgrimage within the season of the year when merchandise was most abundant. This interpretation was first proposed by the medieval Muslim astrologer and astronomer Abu Ma'shar al-Balkhi, and later by al-Biruni, al-Mas'udi, and some western scholars. This interpretation considers Nasī to be a synonym to the Arabic word for "intercalation" (kabīsa). The Arabs, according to one explanation mentioned by Abu Ma'shar, learned of this type of intercalation from the Jews. The Jewish Nasi was the official who decided when to intercalate the Jewish calendar. Some sources say that the Arabs followed the Jewish practice and intercalated seven months over nineteen years, or else that they intercalated nine months over 24 years; there is, however, no consensus among scholars on this issue.

Prohibiting Nasī'

 

Nasi' is interpreted to signify either the postponement of the pre-Islamic month of Hajj, or the (also pre-Islamic) practice of intercalation periodic insertion of an additional month to reset the calendar into accordance with the seasons.

In the tenth year of the Hijra, as documented in the Qur'an (Surah At-Tawbah (9):36–37), Muslims believe God revealed the "prohibition of the Nasī'".

The prohibition of Nasī' would presumably have been announced when the intercalated month had returned to its position just before the month of Nasi' began. If Nasī' meant intercalation, then the number and the position of the intercalary months between AH 1 and AH 10 are uncertain; western calendar dates commonly cited for key events in early Islam such as the Hijra, the Battle of Badr, the Battle of Uhud and the Battle of the Trench should be viewed with caution as they might be in error by one, two, three or even four lunar months. This prohibition was mentioned by Muhammad during the farewell sermon which was delivered on 9 Dhu al-Hijjah AH 10 (Julian date Friday 6 March 632 CE) on Mount Arafat during the farewell pilgrimage to Mecca.

The three successive sacred (forbidden) months mentioned by Prophet Muhammad (months in which battles are forbidden) are Dhu al-Qa'dah, Dhu al-Hijjah, and Muharram, months 11, 12, and 1 respectively. The single forbidden month is Rajab, month 7. These months were considered forbidden both within the new Islamic calendar and within the old pagan Meccan calendar.

Days of the week

The Islamic day begins at sunset. Muslims gather for prayer at a mosque at noon on "gathering day", which corresponds with the lunar start of the day, which is Thursday evening, at the moment when the sun has completely set. Maghrib on this day is the start of the day.

Thus "gathering day" is often regarded as the weekly day off. This is frequently made official, with many Muslim countries adopting Friday and Saturday (e.g., Egypt, Saudi Arabia) or Thursday and Friday as official weekends, during which offices are closed; other countries (e.g., Iran) choose to make Friday alone a day of rest. A few others (e.g., Turkey, Pakistan, Morocco, Nigeria, Malaysia) have adopted the Saturday-Sunday weekend while making Friday a working day with a long midday break to allow time off for worship.

Months
Four of the twelve Hijri months are considered sacred: Rajab (7), and the three consecutive months of Dhū al-Qa'dah (11), Dhu al-Ḥijjah (12) and Muḥarram (1). As the mean duration of a tropical year is 365.24219 days, while the long-term average duration of a synodic month is 29.530587981 days, the average lunar year is (365.24219 − 12 × 29.530587981 ≈) 10.87513 days shorter than the average solar year, causing months of the Hijri calendar to advance about eleven days earlier relative to dates in the Gregorian calendar every calendar year.  "As a result, the cycle of twelve lunar months regresses through the seasons over a
period of about 33 [solar] years".

Length of months
Each month of the Islamic calendar commences on the birth of the new lunar cycle. Traditionally, this is based on actual observation of the moon's crescent (hilal) marking the end of the previous lunar cycle and hence the previous month, thereby beginning the new month. Consequently, each month can have 29 or 30 days depending on the visibility of the moon, astronomical positioning of the earth and weather conditions. However, certain sects and groups, most notably Bohras Muslims namely Alavis, Dawoodis and Sulaymanis and Shia Ismaili Muslims, use a tabular Islamic calendar (see section below) in which odd-numbered months have thirty days (and also the twelfth month in a leap year) and even months have 29.

Year numbering

In pre-Islamic Arabia, it was customary to identify a year after a major event which took place in it. Thus, according to Islamic tradition, Abraha, governor of Yemen, then a province of the Christian Kingdom of Aksum (Ethiopia), attempted to destroy the Kaaba with an army which included several elephants. The raid was unsuccessful, but that year became known as the Year of the Elephant, during which Muhammad was born (sura al-Fil). Most equate this to the year 570 CE, but a minority use 571 CE.

The first ten years of the Hijra were not numbered, but were named after events in the life of Muhammad according to Abū Rayḥān al-Bīrūnī:
 The year of permission.
 The year of the order of fighting.
 The year of the trial.
 The year of congratulation on marriage.
 The year of the earthquake.
 The year of enquiring.
 The year of gaining victory.
 The year of equality.
 The year of exemption.
 The year of farewell.

In  (17 AH), Abu Musa, one of the officials of the Caliph Umar in Basrah, complained about the absence of any years on the correspondence he received from Umar, making it difficult for him to determine which instructions were most recent. This report convinced Umar of the need to introduce an era for Muslims. After debating the issue with his counsellors, he decided that the first year should be the year of Muhammad's arrival at Medina (known as Yathrib, before Muhammad's arrival). Uthman ibn Affan then suggested that the months begin with Muharram, in line with the established custom of the Arabs at that time. The years of the Islamic calendar thus began with the month of Muharram in the year of Muhammad's arrival at the city of Medina, even though the actual emigration took place in Safar and Rabi' I of the intercalated calendar, two months before the commencement of Muharram in the new fixed calendar. Because of the Hijra, the calendar was named the Hijri calendar.

F A Shamsi (1984) postulated that the Arabic calendar was never intercalated. According to him, the first day of the first month of the new fixed Islamic calendar (1 Muharram AH 1) was no different from what was observed at the time. The day the Prophet moved from Quba' to Medina was originally 26 Rabi' I on the pre-Islamic calendar. 1 Muharram of the new fixed calendar corresponded to Friday, 16 July 622 CE, the equivalent civil tabular date (same daylight period) in the Julian calendar. The Islamic day began at the preceding sunset on the evening of 15 July. This Julian date (16 July) was determined by medieval Muslim astronomers by projecting back in time their own tabular Islamic calendar, which had alternating 30- and 29-day months in each lunar year plus eleven leap days every 30 years. For example, al-Biruni mentioned this Julian date in the year 1000 CE. Although not used by either medieval Muslim astronomers or modern scholars to determine the Islamic epoch, the thin crescent moon would have also first become visible (assuming clouds did not obscure it) shortly after the preceding sunset on the evening of 15 July, 1.5 days after the associated dark moon (astronomical new moon) on the morning of 14 July.

Though Cook and Crone in Hagarism: The Making of the Islamic World cite a coin from AH 17, the first surviving attested use of a Hijri calendar date alongside a date in another calendar (Coptic) is on a papyrus from Egypt in AH 22, PERF 558.

Astronomical considerations

Due to the Islamic calendar's reliance on certain variable methods of observation to determine its month-start-dates, these dates sometimes vary slightly from the month-start-dates of the astronomical lunar calendar, which are based directly on astronomical calculations. Still, the Islamic calendar seldom varies by more than three days from the astronomical-lunar-calendar system, and roughly approximates it. Both the Islamic calendar and the astronomical-lunar-calendar take no account of the solar year in their calculations, and thus both of these strictly lunar based calendar systems have no ability to reckon the timing of the four seasons of the year.

In the astronomical-lunar-calendar system, a year of 12 lunar months is 354.37 days long. In this calendar system, lunar months begin precisely at the time of the monthly "conjunction", when the Moon is located most directly between the Earth and the Sun. The month is defined as the average duration of a revolution of the Moon around the Earth (29.53 days). By convention, months of 30 days and 29 days succeed each other, adding up over two successive months to 59 full days. This leaves only a small monthly variation of 44 minutes to account for, which adds up to a total of 24 hours (i.e., the equivalent of one full day) in 2.73 years. To settle accounts, it is sufficient to add one day every three years to the lunar calendar, in the same way that one adds one day to the Gregorian calendar every four years. The technical details of the adjustment are described in Tabular Islamic calendar.

The Islamic calendar, however, is based on a different set of conventions being used for the determination of the month-start-dates. Each month still has either 29 or 30 days, but due to the variable method of observations employed, there is usually no discernible order in the sequencing of either 29 or 30-day month lengths. Traditionally, the first day of each month is the day (beginning at sunset) of the first sighting of the hilal (crescent moon) shortly after sunset. If the hilal is not observed immediately after the 29th day of a month (either because clouds block its view or because the western sky is still too bright when the moon sets), then the day that begins at that sunset is the 30th. Such a sighting has to be made by one or more trustworthy men testifying before a committee of Muslim leaders. Determining the most likely day that the hilal could be observed was a motivation for Muslim interest in astronomy, which put Islam in the forefront of that science for many centuries. Still, due to the fact that both lunar reckoning systems are ultimately based on the lunar cycle itself, both systems still do roughly correspond to one another, never being more than three days out of synchronisation with one another.

This traditional practice for the determination of the start-date of the month is still followed in the overwhelming majority of Muslim countries. For instance, Saudi Arabia uses the sighting method to determine the beginning of each month of the Hijri calendar. Since AH 1419 (1998/99), several official hilal sighting committees have been set up by the government to determine the first visual sighting of the lunar crescent at the beginning of each lunar month. Nevertheless, the religious authorities also allow the testimony of less experienced observers and thus often announce the sighting of the lunar crescent on a date when none of the official committees could see it.

Each Islamic state proceeds with its own monthly observation of the new moon (or, failing that, awaits the completion of 30 days) before declaring the beginning of a new month on its territory. However, the lunar crescent becomes visible only some 17 hours after the conjunction, and only subject to the existence of a number of favourable conditions relative to weather, time, geographic location, as well as various astronomical parameters. Given the fact that the moon sets progressively later than the sun as one goes west, with a corresponding increase in its "age" since conjunction, Western Muslim countries may, under favorable conditions, observe the new moon one day earlier than eastern Muslim countries. Due to the interplay of all these factors, the beginning of each month differs from one Muslim country to another, during the 48-hour period following the conjunction. The information provided by the calendar in any country does not extend beyond the current month.

A number of Muslim countries try to overcome some of these difficulties by applying different astronomy-related rules to determine the beginning of months. Thus, Malaysia, Indonesia, and a few others begin each month at sunset on the first day that the moon sets after the sun (moonset after sunset). In Egypt, the month begins at sunset on the first day that the moon sets at least five minutes after the sun. A detailed analysis of the available data shows, however, that there are major discrepancies between what countries say they do on this subject, and what they actually do. In some instances, what a country says it does is impossible.

Due to the somewhat variable nature of the Islamic calendar, in most Muslim countries, the Islamic calendar is used primarily for religious purposes, while the Solar-based Gregorian calendar is still used primarily for matters of commerce and agriculture.

Theological considerations 
If the Islamic calendar were prepared using astronomical calculations, Muslims throughout the Muslim world could use it to meet all their needs, the way they use the Gregorian calendar today. But, there are divergent views on whether it is licit to do so.

A majority of theologians oppose the use of calculations (beyond the constraint that each month must be not less than 29 nor more than 30 days) on the grounds that the latter would not conform with Muhammad's recommendation to observe the new moon of Ramadan and Shawal in order to determine the beginning of these months.

However, some Islamic jurists see no contradiction between Muhammad's teachings and the use of calculations to determine the beginnings of lunar months. They consider that Muhammad's recommendation was adapted to the culture of the times, and should not be confused with the acts of worship.

Thus the jurists Ahmad Muhammad Shakir and Yusuf al-Qaradawi both endorsed the use of calculations to determine the beginning of all months of the Islamic calendar, in 1939 and 2004 respectively. So did the Fiqh Council of North America (FCNA) in 2006 and the European Council for Fatwa and Research (ECFR) in 2007.

The major Muslim associations of France also announced in 2012 that they would henceforth use a calendar based on astronomical calculations, taking into account the criteria of the possibility of crescent sighting in any place on Earth. But, shortly after the official adoption of this rule by the French Council of the Muslim Faith (CFCM) in 2013, the new leadership of the association decided, on the eve of Ramadan 2013, to follow the Saudi announcement rather than to apply the rule just adopted. This resulted in a division of the Muslim community of France, with some members following the new rule, and others following the Saudi announcement.

Isma'ili-Taiyebi Bohras having the institution of da'i al-mutlaq follow the tabular Islamic calendar (see section below) prepared on the basis of astronomical calculations from the days of Fatimid imams.

Calculated Islamic calendars

Islamic calendar of Turkey 
Turkish Muslims use an Islamic calendar which is calculated several years in advance by the Turkish Presidency of Religious Affairs (Diyanet İşleri Başkanlığı). From 1 Muharrem 1400 AH (21 November 1979) until 29 Zilhicce 1435 (24 October 2014) the computed Turkish lunar calendar was based on the following rule: "The lunar month is assumed to begin on the evening when, within some region of the terrestrial globe, the computed centre of the lunar crescent at local sunset is more than 5° above the local horizon and (geocentrically) more than 8° from the Sun." In the current rule the (computed) lunar crescent has to be above the local horizon of Ankara at sunset.

Saudi Arabia's Umm al-Qura calendar 
Saudi Arabia has traditionally used the Umm al-Qura calendar, which is based on astronomical calculations, for administrative purposes. The parameters used in the establishment of this calendar underwent significant changes during the decade to AH 1423.

Before AH 1420 (before 18 April 1999), if the moon's age at sunset in Riyadh was at least 12 hours, then the day ending at that sunset was the first day of the month. This often caused the Saudis to celebrate holy days one or even two days before other predominantly Muslim countries, including the dates for the Hajj, which can only be dated using Saudi dates because it is performed in Mecca.

From AH 1420–22, if moonset occurred after sunset at Mecca, then the day beginning at that sunset was the first day of a Saudi month, essentially the same rule used by Malaysia, Indonesia, and others (except for the location from which the hilal was observed).

Since the beginning of AH 1423 (16 March 2002), the rule has been clarified a little by requiring the geocentric conjunction of the sun and moon to occur before sunset, in addition to requiring moonset to occur after sunset at Mecca. This ensures that the moon has moved past the sun by sunset, even though the sky may still be too bright immediately before moonset to actually see the crescent.

In 2007, the Islamic Society of North America, the Fiqh Council of North America and the European Council for Fatwa and Research announced that they would henceforth use a calendar based on calculations using the same parameters as the Umm al-Qura calendar to determine (well in advance) the beginning of all lunar months (and therefore the days associated with all religious observances). This was intended as a first step on the way to unify, at some future time, Muslims' calendars throughout the world.

On 14 February 2016, Saudi Arabia adopted the Gregorian calendar for payment of the monthly salaries of government employees (as a cost cutting measure), while retaining the Islamic calendar for religious purposes.

Other calendars using the Islamic era
The Solar Hijri calendar is a solar calendar used in Iran and Afghanistan which counts its years from the Hijra or migration of Muhammad from Mecca to Medina in 622 CE.

Tabular Islamic calendar 

The Tabular Islamic calendar is a rule-based variation of the Islamic calendar, in which months are worked out by arithmetic rules rather than by observation or astronomical calculation. It has a 30-year cycle with 11 leap years of 355 days and 19 years of 354 days. In the long term, it is accurate to one day in about 2,500 solar years or 2,570 lunar years. It also deviates up to about one or two days in the short term.

Kuwaiti algorithm

Microsoft uses the "Kuwaiti algorithm", a variant of the tabular Islamic calendar, to convert Gregorian dates to the Islamic ones. Microsoft claimed that the variant is based on a statistical analysis of historical data from Kuwait, however it matches a known tabular calendar.

Notable dates 

Important dates in the Islamic (Hijri) year are:
 1 Muharram: the Islamic New Year.
 10 Muharram: Day of Ashura. For both Shias and Sunnis, the martyrdom of Husayn ibn Ali, the grandson of Muhammad, and his followers. For Sunnis, the crossing of the Red Sea by Moses occurred on this day, along with many other significant events in the lives of prophets and that have to do with Creation.
 12 Rabi al-Awwal: Mawlid or Birth of the Prophet for Sunnis.
 17 Rabi al-Awwal: Mawlid for Shias.
 27 Rajab: Isra and Mi'raj for the majority of Muslims.
 15 Sha'ban: Mid-Sha'ban, or Night of Forgiveness. For Shiites, also the birthday of Muhammad al-Mahdi, the Twelfth Imam.
 1 Ramadan: The first day of fasting in Islam
 27 Ramadan: Start of the Revelation of the Qur’an. The most probable day Prophet Muhammad received the first verses of the Quran (17 Ramadan in Indonesia and Malaysia).
 Last third of Ramadan which includes Laylat al-Qadr.
 Last friday of Ramadan: Jumu'atul-Wida
 1 Shawwal: Eid ul-Fitr.
 8–13 Dhu al-Hijjah: The Hajj pilgrimage to Mecca.
 9 Dhu al-Hijjah: Day of Arafa.
 10 Dhu al-Hijjah: Eid al-Adha.

Days considered important predominantly for Shia Muslims:
 9 Rabi' al-Awwal: Eid-e-Shuja' (Mukhtar al-Thaqafi avenges the events of Ashura).
 13 Rajab: Birthday of Ali ibn Abi Talib
 3 Sha'ban: Birthday of Husayn ibn Ali.
 21 Ramadan: Martyrdom of Ali ibn Abi Talib.
 18 Dhu al-Hijjah: the Eid al-Ghadir

Uses 

The Islamic calendar is now used primarily for religious purposes, and for official dating of public events and documents in Muslim countries. Because of its nature as a purely lunar calendar, it cannot be used for agricultural purposes and historically Islamic communities have used other calendars for this purpose: the Egyptian calendar was formerly widespread in Islamic countries, and the Iranian calendar and the 1789 Ottoman calendar (a modified Julian calendar) were also used for agriculture in their countries. In the Levant and Iraq the Aramaic names of the Babylonian calendar are still used for all secular matters. In the Maghreb, Berber farmers in the countryside still use the Julian calendar for agrarian purposes. These local solar calendars have receded in importance with the near-universal adoption of the Gregorian calendar for civil purposes. Saudi Arabia uses the lunar Islamic calendar. In Indonesia, the Javanese calendar combines elements of the Islamic and pre-Islamic Saka calendars.

British author Nicholas Hagger writes that after seizing control of Libya, Muammar Gaddafi "declared" on 1 December 1978 "that the Muslim calendar should start with the death of the prophet Mohammed in 632 rather than the hijra (Mohammed's 'emigration' from Mecca to Medina) in 622". This put the country ten solar years behind the standard Muslim calendar. However, according to the 2006 Encyclopedia of the Developing World, "More confusing still is Qaddafi's unique Libyan calendar, which counts the years from the Prophet's birth, or sometimes from his death. The months July and August, named after Julius and Augustus Caesar, are now Nasser and Hannibal respectively." Reflecting on a 2001 visit to the country, American reporter Neil MacFarquhar observed, "Life in Libya was so unpredictable that people weren't even sure what year it was. The year of my visit was officially 1369. But just two years earlier Libyans had been living through 1429. No one could quite name for me the day the count changed, especially since both remained in play. ... Event organizers threw up their hands and put the Western year in parentheses somewhere in their announcements."

Computer support
 Hijri support was available in later versions of traditional Visual Basic, and is also available in the .NET Framework.
 Since the release of Java 8, the Islamic calendar is supported in the new Date and Time API.

See also
 Arabic names of Gregorian months
 Islamic New Year (includes a table of recent and imminent equivalent dates in the Gregorian calendar)
 List of Islamic years (most significant dates have both the Hijri date and the Gregorian date)

 List of observances set by the Islamic calendar
 Pre-Islamic Arabian calendar
 Rumi calendar
 Solar Hijri calendar
 Timeline of Islamic history, including a list of Islamic centuries and the corresponding Gregorian years

Notes

References

External links 

How and Why did the Hijiri Calendar Begin? Al-Ain University
Helmer Aslaksen The Islamic Calendar
Khalid Chraibi, The reform of the Islamic calendar: the terms of the debate, Tabsir.net, September 2012

Open source calendar converters

 
Calendar
Arab inventions